Hylotelephium is a genus of flowering plants in the stonecrop family Crassulaceae. It includes about 33 species distributed in Asia, Europe, and North America.

Species in the genus, formerly included in Sedum, are popular garden plants, known as sedum, stonecrop, live-for-ever, or orpine. Horticulturalists have hybridized many of the species to create new cultivars. Many of the newer ones are patented, so may not be propagated without a license.

Taxonomy

Hylotelephium telephium and related species have been considered in a number of different ways since first being described by Linnaeus in 1753, including as a section of Sedum by Gray in 1821, or a subgenus. But these taxa are quite distinct from Sedum morphologically.

Hylotelephium is one of a group of genera that form a separate lineage from Sedum, and is closely related to Orostachys, Meterostachys, and Sinocrassula.

The separation of the genus has not been universally adopted, for instance a Missouri Botanical Garden website states "Upright Sedums were at one point separated into the genus Hylotelephium, but are now generally included back in the genus Sedum." One of Kew Garden's online databases also lists Hylotelephium as a synonym for Sedum.

Species
The following species are recognised in the genus Hylotelephium:

Hybrids
Hylotelephium hybrids

Etymology

Hylotelephium means ‘woodland distant lover’. ‘Hylo’ is derived from Greek, meaning ‘forest’ or ‘woodland’. ‘Telephium’, also derived from Greek, means ‘distant-lover’; the plant was thought to be able to indicate when one's affections were returned.

References

Bibliography

 (full text at  ResearchGate)

, in Flora of China online vol. 8

 
Crassulaceae
Crassulaceae genera
Taxa named by Hideaki Ohba